Batsford Books is an independent British book publisher.

Batsford was founded in 1843 by Bradley Thomas Batsford. For some time it was an imprint of Pavilion Books. Upon the purchase of Pavilion Books by HarperCollins, on 1 December 2021 B. T. Batsford Ltd once again became an independent publishing house, with Pitkin as an imprint. Polly Powell, former owner of Pavilion Books, became the owner of Batsford Books and John Stachiewicz was appointed chairman

A prominent chairman of the firm from 1952 until 1974 was Brian Batsford, known as Brian Cook, who designed many of its dust-jackets. Notable series in past years have included The Face of Britain series, the English Heritage series, the Batsford Paperbacks and Batsford's Half-Guinea Library. 

Batsford publishes books in various specialty categories such as applied arts, bridge, chess, horticulture and industrial archaeology. Current publications include Millie Marotta's colouring books which have sold in excess of 5 million copies world-wide. Batsford has co-published books with organisations such as the Twentieth Century Society. Under Pavilion, Pitkin Publishing was bought from The History Press in 2017. Pitkin was founded c.1947 and publishes works on English cathedrals and other places of historic and cultural interest. 

Batsford organises the Batsford Prize in conjunction with Cassart. The prize is an annual student award open to national and international undergraduate and postgraduate students of fine and applied art, fashion and illustration. There are five categories for entrants: Fine Art, Applied Arts, Fashion, Illustration and Children's Illustration.

References

Publishing companies of the United Kingdom
1843 establishments in England